USS Radiant (ID-1324) was the proposed designation for a tugboat that never served in the United States Navy.

Radiant was a commercial tug built in 1903 by Neafie & Levy at Philadelphia, Pennsylvania. During the period of the United States' participation in World War I, the US Navy inspected her for possible acquisition by the Navy and assigned her the hull number ID-1324 in anticipation of commissioning her as USS Radiant. However, the Navy never took possession of her, and she remained in civilian service with her owners, the Atlantic Refining Company of Philadelphia.

Notes

References

Cancelled ships of the United States Navy
1903 ships
Ships built by Neafie and Levy
World War I merchant ships of the United States
Tugboats of the United States